is a railway station on the  Echigo Tokimeki Railway Myōkō Haneuma Line in the city of Jōetsu, Niigata, Japan operated by the third-sector operator Echigo Tokimeki Railway.

Lines

Station layout
The station has one side platform serving a single bi-directional track. The station is attended.

Adjacent stations

History
The station opened on 26 October 1928. With the privatization of Japanese National Railways (JNR) on 1 April 1987, the station came under the control of JR East.

From this date, Kasugayama Station was transferred to the ownership of the third-sector operating company Echigo Tokimeki Railway.

Passenger statistics
In fiscal 2017, the station was used by an average of 778 passengers daily (boarding passengers only).

Surrounding area
 Jōetsu City Office
 Site of Kasugayama Castle

See also
 List of railway stations in Japan

References

External links

 Echigo Tokimeki Railway Station information 
 Timetable for Kasugayama Station 

Railway stations in Niigata Prefecture
Railway stations in Japan opened in 1928
Stations of East Japan Railway Company
Jōetsu, Niigata